The flag of Penang consists of three vertical bands and an areca-nut palm on a grassy mount in the centre. All three bands are of equal width. From left to right, the colour of each band is light blue, white and yellow.

The colours of the flag are derived from the tinctures of the coat of arms of Penang that was granted by King George VI in the 1940s. Light blue denotes the sea that surrounds Penang Island, white represents peace and yellow for the prosperity of the state.

The areca-nut palm, known as pokok pinang in Malay, symbolises the tree from which Penang got its name. The tree and its grassy mount is centred within the middle white band.

The flag was slightly modified to its present form in the 1960s by removing a torse of blue and white at the bottom of the grassy mount.

History
On 23 November 1949, the British resident commissioner A.V. Aston asserted that the Union Jack remained the official flag of Penang amidst doubts over its status after the Settlement Council adopted a crest to represent the colony. A flag badge depicting the areca-nut palm was adopted on 17 June 1952 by the Settlement Council.

A few months before Malayan independence, the Settlement Government announced a competition on 17 May 1957 to design a new state flag for Penang. The winner, a C.K. Fook of 434, Chulia Street, was awarded $500 for his design on 20 August. The final modified design differed on the shade of blue submitted by Fook, but it was decided to award the prize to him regardless.

The new state flag of Penang was raised at noon on 30 August 1957 at the Padang in the presence of the new governor Raja Uda and the last resident commissioner Robert Porter Bingham. That evening, the Union Jack was lowered for the final time at 6:45 pm near Fort Cornwallis, George Town, marking the end of 171 years of British rule.

On 24 December 1957, nominated member Koh Sin Hock told the State Council that the flag's areca-nut palm did not resemble a real one, likening it to a coconut palm, and that he hoped a more realistic depiction could be used instead.

Historical flags

City flags 

The State of Penang is divided between two local governments. The Penang Island City Council administers Penang's capital city of George Town and the entirety of Penang Island, whilst the Seberang Perai City Council governs Seberang Perai on the Malay Peninsula. 

Previously, the city of George Town also had its own flag, which dated back to the grant of city status to the George Town City Council in 1957.  The City Council was eventually merged with the Penang Island Rural District Council in 1974 to form the Penang Island Municipal Council, which subsequently became the Penang Island City Council in 2015.

Notes

References

External links
 Penang at Flags of the World
 Tourism Penang State Government Official Website

Penang
Penang
Penang